Rouyn-Noranda was a former provincial electoral district in the Abitibi-Témiscamingue region of Quebec, Canada, which elected members to the National Assembly of Quebec (known as the Legislative Assembly of Quebec until December 1968). It was located in and around the city of Rouyn-Noranda.

It was created for the 1944 election from parts of the now-defunct Témiscamingue electoral district. Its final election was in 1976. It disappeared in the 1981 election and its successor electoral district was Rouyn-Noranda–Témiscamingue.

Members of the Legislative Assembly / National Assembly

External links
 Election results (National Assembly)
 Election results (Quebecpolitique.com)

Former provincial electoral districts of Quebec
Rouyn-Noranda